The 1998 United States Senate election in Kansas was held November 3, 1998. Incumbent Republican U.S. Senator Sam Brownback won re-election to his first full term. Brownback was first elected in a special election held in 1996, when then-Senator Bob Dole resigned to campaign for U.S. President, after 27 years in the Senate.

Democratic primary

Candidates 
 Todd Covault
 Paul Feleciano, Jr., State Senator

Results

Republican primary

Candidates 
 Sam Brownback, incumbent U.S. Senator

Results

General election

Candidates 
 Sam Brownback (R), incumbent U.S. Senator
 Paul Feleciano (D), State Senator

Results

See also 
 1998 United States Senate elections

References 

United States Senate
Kansas
1998